This is a list of parliamentary by-elections in the United Kingdom held between 1806 and 1818, with the names of the previous incumbent and the victor in the by-election.

In the absence of a comprehensive and reliable source, for party and factional alignments in this period, no attempt is made to define them in this article. The House of Commons: 1790-1820 provides some guidance to the complex and shifting political relationships, but it is significant that the compilers of that work make no attempt to produce a definitive list of each member's allegiances.

Resignations

Where the cause of by-election is given as "resignation", this indicates that the incumbent was appointed on his own request to an "office of profit under the Crown". Offices used, in this period, were the Stewards of the Chiltern Hundreds or the Manor of East Hendred and the Escheators of Munster or Ulster.  These appointments are made as a constitutional device for leaving the House of Commons, whose Members are not permitted to resign. If the vacancy was caused by appointment to another office then this office is noted in brackets.

By-elections
The c/u column denotes whether the by-election was a contested poll or an unopposed return. If the winner was re-elected, at the next general election and any intermediate by-elections, this is indicated by an * following the c or u. In a few cases the winner was elected at the next general election but had not been re-elected in a by-election after the one noted. In those cases no * symbol is used.

3rd Parliament (1806–1807)

4th Parliament (1807–1812)

5th Parliament (1812–1818)

References

 
 Return of the name of every member of the lower house of parliament of England, Scotland, and Ireland, with name of constituency represented, and date of return, from 1213 to 1874.

External links
 History of Parliament: Members 1790-1820
 History of Parliament: Constituencies 1790-1820

1806
19th century in the United Kingdom